Russian federal highways (lit. highways of federal importance of the Russian Federation) are the most important highways in Russia that are federal property. The following motorways are designated as federal.

All highways
 that connect Moscow with the capitals of the neighbouring countries and with the administrative centres of the subjects of the Russian Federation. They are identified by the prefix "M" in the national route signs;
 that are parts of the international road networks: European and Asian, identified by prefixes "E" and "AH" in the international route signs used simultaneously with the national route signs.
Some highways
that connect administrative centers of the subjects of the Russian Federation with each other (national route sign prefix "P," which is the Cyrillic "R")
that are branching and bridging roads (national prefix "A"):
 access roads that lead to major transportation nodes and special objects
 access roads from the administrative centers of the subjects of the Russian Federation which has no highway connection with Moscow to the nearest sea and river ports and to the international borders.
which interlink other federal highways.

The federal highways are classified in Russia into two categories: 
"motorways/Avtomagistral", not the same as the English term motorway
"other".

Roads of regional and intermunicipal importance
The local importance roads in Russia are designated with a letter prefix and a number as well as the OKATO (Общероссийский классификатор объектов административно-территориального деления, Russian classification on objects of administrative division) code for the region.

These roads use the following prefixes:
 P: Highways of federal or regional significance connecting the administrative centers of the Russian Federation
 A: Highways that are branching and bridging roads:
 access roads that lead to major transportation nodes and special objects
 access roads from the administrative centers of the subjects of the Russian Federation which has no highway connection with Moscow to the nearest sea and river ports and to the international borders
 which interlink other federal highways
 K: for other roads of regional importance
 N: for roads of intermunicipal significance

Network map

Federal highways

Former routes
A-100 "Mozhayskoe Road": Moscow to route R90
A-102: Moscow - Lyubertsy - Zhukovsky - Ramenskoye
A-113: Kostroma - Ivanovo; redesignated as R600
A-115: Route M10 to Novaya Ladoga; downgraded to 49K-05
A-117: Opochka to the border with Belarus; downgraded to 58K-284
A-122 "Vyborg Highway": Pargolovo - Ogonki; downgraded to 41A-180 in 2020
A-128: Saint Petersburg -  Vsevolozhsk - Mor'ye; downgraded to 41K-064
A-131: Access roads from route A130 to "Arkhangelsk" holiday resort, "Voskresenskoe" household plot and "Desna" sanatorium and holiday resort; designation cancelled in 2013 and transferred to state ownership
A-138: Murmansk - Sputnik - Pechenga, became a portion of M18 (now R21) in 2003
A-141: Bryansk - Smolensk to the border with Belarus (on to Rudnev, Vitebsk); entrance to the city of Smolensk; now part of R120
A-143: Tambov - Morshansk - Shatsk
A-144: Kursk - Voronezh - Borisoglebsk to route M6; redesignated as R298 and R22 in 2018
A-148: Route M27 to Krasnaya Polyana; redesignated as A149
A-154: Astrakhan - Elista - Stavropol; redesignated as R216 in 2018
A-156: Lermontov - Cherkessk; redesignated as A165 in 2018
A-164: Kultuk - Mondy to the border with Mongolia; redesignated as A333 in 2010
A-165: Route R297 (Ulan-Ude) - Kyakhta to the border with Mongolia; redesignated as A340 in 2018
A-166: Chita-Zabaikalsk to the border with the People's Republic of China; redesignated as A350 in 2018
A-181: Route A370 – Rudnaya Pristan; redesignated as 05N-100 in 2018
A-182: Route A370 - Khorol' - Kamen'-Rybolov - Turiy Rog
A-183: Route A370 - Yaroslavsky - Zharikovo - Kommissarovo
A-184: Ussuriysk - Galenki - Lipovtsy to the border with the People's Republic of China
A-188: Uglovoye - Artem - Fokino - Nakhodka
A-189: Route A370 - Razdolnoe - Barabash - Kraskino - Hasan, border crossing into North Korea
A-332: Irkutsk - Ust-Ordynskiy; former 1R-418, designation cancelled in 2012
A-349: Barnaul - Rubtsovsk to the border with Kazakhstan (on to Semipalatinsk); redesignated as A322
A-381: Naryan-Mar - Naryan-Mar Airport; designation cancelled in 2022
A-382: Dudinka - Norilsk (Alykel Airport); designation cancelled in 2019
A-383: Tura - Tura Airport (Gornyy); designation cancelled in 2019
A-385: Ust'-Palana - Palana Airport; designation cancelled in 2011 and transferred to state ownership

Regional routes
Cyrillic Р is used on signs.

R-1: Brin-Navolok - Mirnyy - Kargopol' - Pesok - Prokshino; downgraded to 11P-001
R-2: Dolmatovo - Nyandoma - Kargopol'
R-5: Vologda - Vitegra - Pudozh - Medvezhyegorsk, redesignated as A119
R-6: Cherepovets - Belozyorsk  - Lipin Bor
R-7: Chekshino - Tot'ma - Nikolsk
R-8: Ustyuzhna - Valdai
R-10: Pechenga to the border with Norway; became a portion of M18 (now R21) in 2003
R-12 "Lotta": Murmansk to the border with Finland; downgraded to 47A-059 in 2018
R-15:
R-16:
R-17:
R-18: Byelomorsk to route R21 "Kola"
R-19: Petrozavodsk - Voznesen'ye
R-20: Route A17 - Dzhankoy to the border with Ukraine
R-25: Syktyvkar - Yemva - Ukhta
R-26:
R-27:
R-28:
R-33:
R-34:
R-35: Saint Petersburg - Keikino; downgraded to 41K-008
R-36:
R-37 "Lodeynoye Pole - Brin-Navolok": Lodeynoye Pole - Vytegra; upgraded to A215 in 2018
R-38:
R-39:
R-40:
R-41:
R-42:
R-47:
R-48:
R-49:
R-50:
R-51:
R-52:
R-53:
R-57:
R-58:
R-59:
R-60:
R-61:
R-62:
R-63:
R-68:
R-71:
R-72: Vladimir - Murom - Arzamas
R-73:
R-74:
R-75:
R-76:
R-79:
R-80:
R-81: Kineshma - Elnat - Yuryevets - Puchezh - Tchkalovsk
R-84: Tver - Bezhetsk - Krasnyy Kholm - Vesegonsk  - Ustyuzhna
R-85: Vishny Volochek - Maksatikha - Bezhetsk - Sonkovo
R-87: Rzhev - Selizharovo - Ostashkov
P-88:
R-89: Ostashkov - Volgoverkhovye
P-90: Route M1 "Belarus" - Tver
R-93: Medyn - Kondrovo - Kaluga
P-94:
P-95:
P-96:
R-98: Kostroma - Sudislavl' - Makar'yev - Manturovo - Georgiyevskoye - Verkhnespasskoye
P-99:
R-100: Sudislavl - Galich - Chuhloma - Soligalich
R-101:
R-104: Sergiev Posad - Kalyazin - Uglich - Myshkin - Poshekhon'ye - Rybinsk - Cherepovets
R-105 "Kasimovskoye Highway": Moscow - Kasimovo
R-106:
R-107:
R-108:
R-109:
R-110 "Fryanovskoe Highway": Schelkovo - Fryanovo
R-111 "Pyatnitskoye Highway": Moscow - Solnechogorsk
R-112: Dmitrov - Taldom - Tempi
R-113 "Rogachev Highway":  Krasnaya Gorka - Lobnya - Kamenka - Fedorovka - Rogachevo
R-114:
R-115:
R-116:
R-123:
R-124: Shatsk - Sasovo - Pitelino - Kasimov; downgraded to 61K-012
R-125: Nizhny Novgorod - Ryazhsk
R-126:
R-127:
R-130:
R-133:
R-134: Smolensk - Vyaz'ma - Zubtsov
R-135:
R-136:
R-137:
R-139: Belyov - Odoyev - Tula
R-140:
R-141:
R-142:
R-143:
R-144:
R-145:
R-146:
R-147:
R-148:
R-151: Yaroslavl - Rybinsk
R-152: Rostov - Ivanovo - Shuya - Nizhny Novgorod
R-156: Nizhny Novgorod, Arzamas-Saransk
R-157: Uren - Shar'ya - Nikolsk - Veliky Ustyug - Kotlas
R-159: Nizhny Novgorod - Krasnyye Baki - Shakhun'ya - Yaransk
R-160:
R-161:
R-162: Rabotki - Poretskoe
R-166:
R-167:
R-168:
R-169:
R-172:
R-173:
R-174:
1R-175: Yoshkar-Ola - Zelenodolsk to route M7; redesignated as A295 in 2018
R-179:
R-180: Saransk to route M5
R-185:
R-186:
R-187:
R-188: Stary Oskol - New Oskol
R-189:
R-190:
R-191:
R-194: Route A144 to Ostrogozhsk - Rossosh - Kantemirovka
R-195:
R-196: Route R194 to Podgorensky to route M4
R-199:
R-200: Ukrainian border near Gogolivka - Sudzha - Semenikhivka; extra unregistered portion from Semenikhivka to Kursk at European route E105 and European route E38
R-203:
R-204:
R-205:
1R-209: Kirsanov - Penza; became a portion of R208
R-214:
R-216: Astrakhan - Liman; became a portion of R215 
R-219:
R-220:
R-221: Volgograd - Elista
R-224: Samara - Busuluk  - Orenburg
R-225: Samara - Buguruslan
R-226: Samara - Engels - Volzhskiy
R-226: Samara - Saratov - Volgograd
R-227: Syzran - Shigony - Usolye
R-231:
R-234:
R-235:
R-236:
R-246: Bugul'ma - Buguruslan - Busuluk to the border with Kazakhstan
R-253: Maikop - Labinsk - Korenovsk; redesignated as A160
R-254: Maikop - Guzeripl’ - Caucasian state Biosphere Reserve; redesignated as A159
R-262:
R-263: Neftekumsk - Zelenokumsk - Mineral’nye Vody; became a portion of A167
R-264:
R-265:
R-285: Kochubey - Neftekumsk; became a portion of A167
R-289: Prokhladnyy - Baksan; became a portion of A158 in 2018
R-291: Kizlyar - Makhachkala; became a portion of R215
R-291: Route M29 - Verkhnyaya Balkariya - Ushtulu; redesignated A154
R-297: Alagir - Nizhniy Zaramag - South Ossetia; became a portion of A164 in 2018
R-297: Vladikavkaz - Alagir; redesignated as A162
R-298: Kardzhin - Alagir; became a portion of A164 in 2018
R-301: Vladikavkaz - Nizhniy Lars to the border with Georgia, redesignated A161 in 2017
R-301: Entrance to Vladikavkaz Airport
R-314: Ufa - Orenburg (including Ufa bypass); redesignated R240 in 2010
R-316: Sterlitamak - Beloretsk - Magnitogorsk
R-317: Birsk - Tastuba - Satka
R-322: Izhevsk - Sarapul
R-330: Shadrinsk to route P254 "Irytsh"
1R-335: Orenburg - Ilek to the border with Kazakhstan (on to Uralsk); redesignated A305 in 2018
R-336: Orenburg - Orsk
R-337: Sara - Yuldybaevo
1R-344: Nyvta - Kudymkar, redesignated A153 in 2018
R-352: Yekaterinburg - Nizhny Tagil - Serov
R-355: Yekaterinburg - Polevskoy
R-380: Novosibirsk - Kamen-na-Obi - Barnaul
R-384: Novosibirsk - Zhuravlyovo - Leninsk-Kuznetsk - Kemerovo - Yurga
R-384-1: Leninsk-Kuznetsk - Novokuznetsk
R-400: Tomsk - Mariinsk
R-401: Tyumen - Roshino Airport
R-403:
R-408:
R-409 "Yeniseyskiy trakt": Krasnoyarsk - Eniseisk; downgraded to 04K-044
R-410:
R-411:
R-412:
R-413:
R-418: Irkutsk - Ust-Ordynskiy; redesignated as A332
R-419: Route M53 - Bratsk - Ust’-Kut - Mirnyy - Yakutsk; redesignated A331 in 2007
R-420:
R-425:
R-426:
R-427:
R-428:
R-429:
R-430:
R-431:
R-436: Ulan-Ude - Romanivka - Chita; downgraded to 81P-002 and 76A-138
R-437: Romanovka - Bagdarin
R-438 "Barguzinskiy trakt": Ulan-Ude - Kurumkan
R-439:
R-440 "Dzhidinskiy trakt": Gusinoozyorsk - Zakamensk
R-441: Mukhorshibir - Bichura - Kyakhta
R-442:
R-447: Nakhodka - Lazo - Kavalerovo; downgraded to 05N-131, upgraded to A375
R-448: Lazo - Preobrazheniye
R-449: Route A370 to Lesozavodsk - Gornyye Klyuchi to route A370
R-454: Khabarovsk - Komsomolsk-on-Amur; downgraded to 08A-1, upgraded to A376 in 2018
R-455: Birobidzhan - Leninskoye - Dezhnevo
R-456: Birofeld - Amurzet
R-461:
R-463:
R-464:
R-465:
R-466:
R-467:
R-468:
R-469:
R-474:
R-475:
R-481:
R-482:
R-487: Yuzhno-Sakhalinsk - Okha
1R-488: Yuzhno-Sakhalinsk - Korsakov; redesignated A391 in 2018
R-489:
R-490:
R-491:
R-492:
R-493:
R-495: Yuzhno-Sakhalinsk - Kholmsk; redesignated A392
R-501: 
R-502:
R-503:
R-508:
R-509:
R-510:
R-511:
R-512:
R-513:
R-514:
R-515:
R-516:
R-517:
R-600: Kostroma - Ivanovo; former A113
-: Yuzhno-Sakhalinsk, Kholmsk

Access roads to ports, airports and railroad stations from cities Petropavlovsk-Kamchatsky, Anadyr, Dudinka, Naryan-Mar, Salekhard, Khanty-Mansiysk and from the urban-type settlements of Palana and Tura.

Recent additions
Ufa–Orenburg and the Ufa western bypass (published December 24, 2008, to be in force since January 1, 2010)

References

Roads in Russia